Ramsay is a historic estate located at Greenwood in Albemarle County, Virginia.  Contributing elements on the estate include the main house (c. 1900), barn (c. 1937), garden (c. 1937), cottage (c. 1950), tenant house and garage (c. 1900), main house garage (c. 1900), potting shed (c. 1937), three greenhouse ruins (c. 1939), smoke house, chicken house, equipment shed, slave cabin ruins (c. 1830 and moved 1930), and a circular turnaround (c. 1930's).  The main house is a classical Revival style dwelling begun about 1900 with sympathetic additions dated to 1937, 1947, and the early 1950s.  The sympathetic additions and modifications, and barn and garden, were designed by noted Charlottesville architect Milton L. Grigg (1905–1982).

It was listed on the National Register of Historic Places in 2009.

See also
 Emmanuel Church (Greenwood, Virginia)

References

Houses on the National Register of Historic Places in Virginia
Neoclassical architecture in Virginia
Houses completed in 1900
Houses in Albemarle County, Virginia
National Register of Historic Places in Albemarle County, Virginia
Virginia Historic Landmarks
Slave cabins and quarters in the United States